San Mateo, Spanish for Saint Matthew, is the name for many places:

Bolivia
 San Matéo River
 San Matéo River (Ichilo River)

Canary Islands
 Vega de San Mateo, a municipality on the island of Gran Canaria, Las Palmas province

Colombia
 San Mateo, Boyacá
 San Mateo (TransMilenio), a bus station in Bogotá

Costa Rica
 San Mateo (canton), a canton in the province of Alajuela
 San Mateo de Alajuela, a city and district in the canton

Guatemala
 San Mateo, Quetzaltenango

Mexico

State of Mexico
 San Mateo Atenco

Oaxaca
 San Mateo Cajonos
 San Mateo del Mar
 San Mateo Etlatongo
 San Mateo Nejapam
 San Mateo Peñasco
 San Mateo Piñas
 San Mateo Río Hondo
 San Mateo Sindihui
 San Mateo Tlapiltepec
 San Mateo Yoloxochitlán

Peru
 San Mateo de Otao District
 San Mateo District, Huarochirí

Philippines
 San Mateo, Isabela
 San Mateo, Rizal
 San Mateo, San Pablo

Spain
 San Mateo (Cantabria), a village of the municipality of the Los Corrales de Buelna, Cantabria

United States
 San Mateo County, California
 San Mateo, California
 San Mateo, Florida
 San Mateo, New Mexico
 San Mateo (Santurce), Puerto Rico

Venezuela
 San Mateo, Anzoátegui
 San Mateo, Aragua

Other uses
 San Mateo (water), a brand of bottled water sold in Peru

See also
Sant Mateu (disambiguation)
São Mateus (disambiguation)
Saint-Mathieu (disambiguation)